"Lonely" is a song by American record producer Diplo and group Jonas Brothers. It was released through Mad Decent and Columbia Records as the lead single from the former's second studio album, Diplo Presents Thomas Wesley, Chapter 1: Snake Oil, on September 27, 2019. The music video was released alongside the song.

Promotion
On September 25, 2019, Diplo used the Jonas Brothers' Instagram account to unfollow everyone but his own account and posted photos of himself on their feed, with E! News later revealing it was a publicity stunt for an upcoming collaboration.

Music video
The video was released on September 27, 2019, and was directed by Brandon Dermer. The brothers are seen sharply dressed while singing in a studio, while Diplo at one point wears a red-white-and-blue western suit and rides a horse. The video begins with Diplo apologizing to Joe about "ruining" his wedding. Throughout the video, Diplo is seen touring the world while trying to get through to the Jonas Brothers, but they keep declining him. In the end, they finally decide to call the American producer himself, but when Diplo is about to accept the call, his phone battery runs out and he puts it down.

Live performances
The Jonas Brothers performed the song live for the first time (without Diplo) during a set at the Grammy Museum in Los Angeles on October 7.

Charts

Certifications

References

2019 singles
2019 songs
Diplo songs
Jonas Brothers songs
Columbia Records singles
Songs written by King Henry (producer)
Songs written by Joe Jonas
Songs written by Nick Jonas
Songs written by Jr Blender
Songs written by Ryan Tedder
Songs written by Diplo
Song recordings produced by Diplo
Song recordings produced by Ryan Tedder